John of Gaunt, Duke of Lancaster (6 March 1340 – 3 February 1399) was an English royal prince, military leader, and statesman. He was the third surviving son of King Edward III of England, and the father of King Henry IV. Due to Gaunt's royal origin, advantageous marriages, and some generous land grants, he was one of the richest men of his era, and was an influential figure during the reigns of both his father and his nephew, Richard II. As Duke of Lancaster, he is the founder of the royal House of Lancaster, whose members would ascend the throne after his death. His birthplace, Ghent in Flanders, then known in English as Gaunt, was the origin of his name. When he became unpopular later in life, a scurrilous rumour circulated, along with lampoons, claiming that he was actually the son of a Ghent butcher. This rumour, which infuriated him, may have been inspired by the fact that Edward III had not been present at his birth.

John's early career was spent in France and Spain fighting in the Hundred Years' War. He made an abortive attempt to enforce a claim to the Crown of Castile that came through his second wife, Constance of Castile, and for a time styled himself as King of Castile. When Edward the Black Prince, Gaunt's elder brother and heir-apparent to the ageing Edward III, became incapacitated due to poor health, Gaunt assumed control of many government functions, and rose to become one of the most powerful political figures in England. He was faced with military difficulties abroad and political divisions at home, and disagreements as to how to deal with these crises led to tensions among Gaunt, the English Parliament, and the ruling class, making him an extremely unpopular figure for a time.

John exercised great influence over the English throne during the minority of King Richard II (Edward the Black Prince's son) and the ensuing periods of political strife. He mediated between the king and a group of rebellious nobles, which included Gaunt's own son and heir-apparent, Henry Bolingbroke. Following Gaunt's death in 1399, his estates and titles were declared forfeit to the Crown, and his son Henry, now disinherited, was branded a traitor and exiled. Henry returned from exile shortly after to reclaim his inheritance, and deposed Richard. He reigned as King Henry IV of England (1399–1413), the first of the descendants of John of Gaunt to hold the English throne.

All English monarchs from Henry IV onward are descended from John of Gaunt. His direct male line, the House of Lancaster, would rule England from 1399 until the time of the Wars of the Roses. Gaunt is also generally believed to have fathered five children outside marriage: one early in life by a lady-in-waiting to his mother; the others, surnamed Beaufort, by Katherine Swynford, his long-term mistress and third wife. They were later legitimised by royal and papal decrees, but this did not affect Henry IV's bar to their having a place in the line of succession. Through his daughter Joan Beaufort, Countess of Westmorland, he was an ancestor of the Yorkist kings Edward IV, Edward V and Richard III. Through his great-granddaughter Lady Margaret Beaufort he was also an ancestor of Henry VII, who married Edward IV's daughter Elizabeth of York, and all subsequent monarchs are descendants of their marriage. Two of John's daughters married into continental royal houses (those of Portugal and Castile). Through them, many royal families of Europe can trace lineage to him.

Early life

John was the third surviving son of King Edward III of England. His first wife, Blanche of Lancaster, was also his third cousin; both were great-great-grandchildren of King Henry III. They married in 1359 at Reading Abbey as a part of the efforts of Edward III to arrange matches for his sons with wealthy heiresses. Upon the death of his father-in-law, the Duke of Lancaster, in 1361, John received half his lands, the title "Earl of Lancaster", and distinction as the greatest landowner in Northern England as heir of the Palatinate of Lancaster. He also became the 14th Baron of Halton and 11th Lord of Bowland. John inherited the rest of the Lancaster property when Blanche's sister Maud, Countess of Leicester (married to William V, Count of Hainaut), died without issue on 10 April 1362.

John received the title "Duke of Lancaster" from his father on 13 November 1362. By then well established, he owned at least thirty castles and estates across England and France and maintained a household comparable in scale and organisation to that of a monarch. He owned land in almost every county in England, a patrimony that produced a net income of between £8,000 and £10,000 a year, equivalent in 2023 to c.£170 – 213 million in income value, or £3.5 – 4.4 billion in relation to gdp.

Military commander
Because of his rank, John of Gaunt was one of England's principal military commanders in the 1370s and 1380s, though his enterprises were never rewarded with the kind of dazzling success that had made his elder brother Edward the Black Prince such a charismatic war leader.

War in France 
On the resumption of war with France in 1369, John was sent to Calais with Humphrey de Bohun, Earl of Hereford and a small English army with which he raided into northern France. On 23 August, he was confronted by a much larger French army under Philip the Bold, Duke of Burgundy. Exercising his first command, John dared not attack such a superior force and the two armies faced each other across a marsh for several weeks until the English were reinforced by the Thomas de Beauchamp, Earl of Warwick, at which the French withdrew without offering battle. John and Warwick then decided to strike Harfleur, the base of the French fleet on the Seine. Further reinforced by German mercenaries, they marched on Harfleur, but were delayed by French guerilla operations while the town prepared for a siege. John invested the town for four days in October, but he was losing so many men to dysentery and bubonic plague that he decided to abandon the siege and return to Calais. During this retreat, the army had to fight its way across the Somme at the ford of Blanchetaque against a French army led by Hugh de Châtillon, who was captured and sold to Edward III. By the middle of November, the survivors of the sickly army returned to Calais, where the Earl of Warwick died of the plague. Though it seemed an inglorious conclusion to the campaign, John had forced the French king, Charles V, to abandon his plans to invade England that autumn.

In the summer of 1370, John was sent with a small army to Aquitaine to reinforce his ailing elder brother, the Black Prince, and his younger brother Edmund of Langley, Duke of York, Earl of Cambridge. With them, he participated in the Siege of Limoges (September 1370). He took charge of the siege operations and at one point engaged in hand-to-hand fighting in the undermining tunnels. After this event, the Black Prince gave John the lieutenancy of Aquitaine and sailed for England, leaving John in charge. Though he attempted to defend the duchy against French encroachment for nearly a year, lack of resources and money meant he could do little but husband what small territory the English still controlled, and he resigned the command in September 1371 and returned to England. Just before leaving Aquitaine, he married the Infanta Constance of Castile in September 1371 at Roquefort, near Bordeaux, Guyenne. The following year he took part with his father, Edward III, in an abortive attempt to invade France with a large army, which was frustrated by three months of unfavourable winds.

Probably John's most notable feat of arms occurred in August–December 1373, when he attempted to relieve Aquitaine by the landward route, leading an army of some 9,000 mounted men from Calais on a great chevauchée from north-eastern to south-western France on a 900-kilometre raid. This four-month ride through enemy territory, evading French armies on the way, was a bold stroke that impressed contemporaries but achieved virtually nothing. Beset on all sides by French ambushes and plagued by disease and starvation, John of Gaunt and his raiders battled their way through Champagne, east of Paris, into Burgundy, across the Massif Central, and finally down into Dordogne. Unable to attack any strongly fortified forts and cities, the raiders plundered the countryside, which weakened the French infrastructure, but the military value of the damage was only temporary. Marching in winter across the Limousin plateau, with stragglers being picked off by the French, huge numbers of the army, and even larger numbers of horses, died of cold, disease or starvation. The army reached English-occupied Bordeaux on 24 December 1373, severely weakened in numbers with the loss of at least one-third of their force in action and another third to disease. Upon arrival in Bordeaux, many more succumbed to the bubonic plague that was raging in the city. Sick, demoralised and mutinous, the army was in no shape to defend Aquitaine, and soldiers began to desert. John had no funds with which to pay them, and despite his entreaties, none were sent from England, so in April 1374, he abandoned the enterprise and sailed for home.

John's final campaign in France took place in 1378. He planned a 'great expedition' of mounted men in a large armada of ships to land at Brest and take control of Brittany. Not enough ships could be found to transport the horses, and the expedition was tasked with the more limited objective of capturing St. Malo. The English destroyed the shipping in St. Malo harbour and began to assault the town by land on 14 August, but John was soon hampered by the size of his army, which was unable to forage because French armies under Olivier de Clisson and Bertrand du Guesclin occupied the surrounding countryside, harrying the edges of his force. In September, the siege was simply abandoned and the army returned ingloriously to England. John of Gaunt received most of the blame for the debâcle.

Partly as a result of these failures, and those of other English commanders at this period, John was one of the first important figures in England to conclude that the war with France was unwinnable because of France's greater resources of wealth and manpower. He began to advocate peace negotiations; indeed, as early as 1373, during his great raid through France, he made contact with Guillaume Roger, brother and political adviser of Pope Gregory XI, to let the pope know he would be interested in a diplomatic conference under papal auspices. This approach led indirectly to the Anglo-French Congress of Bruges in 1374–77, which resulted in the short-lived Truce of Bruges between the two sides. John was himself a delegate to the various conferences that eventually resulted in the Truce of Leulinghem in 1389. The fact that he became identified with the attempts to make peace added to his unpopularity at a period when the majority of Englishmen believed victory would be in their grasp if only the French could be defeated decisively as they had been in the 1350s. Another motive was John's conviction that it was only by making peace with France would it be possible to release sufficient manpower to enforce his claim to the throne of Castile.

Succession to the throne 

After the death in 1376 of his older brother Edward of Woodstock (also known as the "Black Prince"), John of Gaunt contrived to protect the religious reformer John Wycliffe, possibly to counteract the growing secular power of the church. However, John's ascendancy to political power coincided with widespread resentment of his influence. At a time when English forces encountered setbacks in the Hundred Years' War against France, and Edward III's rule was becoming unpopular due to high taxation and his affair with Alice Perrers, political opinion closely associated the Duke of Lancaster with the failing government of the 1370s. Furthermore, while King Edward and the Prince of Wales were popular heroes due to their successes on the battlefield, John of Gaunt had not won equivalent military renown that could have bolstered his reputation. Although he fought in the Battle of Nájera (1367), for example, his later military projects proved unsuccessful.

When Edward III died in 1377 and John's ten-year-old nephew succeeded as Richard II of England, John's influence strengthened. However, mistrust remained, and some suspected him of wanting to seize the throne himself. John took pains to ensure that he never became associated with the opposition to Richard's kingship. As de facto ruler during Richard's minority, he made unwise decisions on taxation that led to the Peasants' Revolt in 1381, when the rebels destroyed his home in London, the Savoy Palace. Unlike some of Richard's unpopular advisors, John was away from London at the time of the uprising and thus avoided the direct wrath of the rebels.

In 1386 John left England to seek the throne of Castile, claimed in jure uxoris by right of his second wife, Constance of Castile, whom he had married in 1371. However, crisis ensued almost immediately in his absence, and in 1387 King Richard's misrule brought England to the brink of civil war. John had to give up on his ambitions in Spain and hurry back to England in 1389. Only John's intervention in the political crisis succeeded in persuading the Lords Appellant and King Richard to compromise to usher in a period of relative stability. During the 1390s, John's reputation of devotion to the well-being of the kingdom was largely restored.

Marriages and family 
John was married three times.  His first wife, Blanche of Lancaster, was also his third cousin; both were great-great-grandchildren of King Henry III. They married in 1359 at Reading Abbey.  They had seven children; only three survived to adulthood.

After Blanche's death in 1368, shortly after the birth of her last child, John married, in 1371, Infanta Constance of Castile, daughter of King Peter of Castile, giving him a claim to the Crown of Castile.  They had one daughter.  Constance died in 1394.

During his second marriage, some time around 1373 (the approximate birth year of their eldest son, John Beaufort) John of Gaunt entered into an extra-marital love affair with Katherine Swynford, the daughter of an ordinary knight, which would produce four children for the couple. All of them were born out of wedlock, but were legitimised upon their parents' eventual marriage. The adulterous relationship endured until 1381, when it was ended out of political necessity.

On 13 January 1396, two years after the death of Constance of Castile, Katherine and John of Gaunt married in Lincoln Cathedral. Their children were given the surname "Beaufort" after a former French possession of the duke. The Beaufort children, three sons and a daughter, were legitimised by royal and papal decrees after John and Katherine married. A later proviso that they were specifically barred from inheriting the throne—the phrase  ("except royal status")—was inserted with dubious authority by their half-brother Henry IV.

Regent

Head of government 
On his return from France in 1374, John took a more decisive and persistent role in the direction of English foreign policy. From then until 1377, he was effectively the head of the English government due to the illness of his father and elder brother, who were unable to exercise authority. His vast estates made him the richest man in England, and his great wealth, ostentatious display of it, autocratic manner and attitudes, enormous London mansion (the Savoy Palace on the Strand) and association with the failed peace process at Bruges combined to make him the most visible target of social resentments. His time at the head of government was marked by the so-called Good Parliament of 1376 and the Bad Parliament of 1377. The first, called to grant massive war taxation to the Crown, turned into a parliamentary revolution, with the Commons (supported to some extent by the Lords) venting their grievances at decades of crippling taxation, misgovernment, and suspected endemic corruption among the ruling classes. John was left isolated (even the Black Prince supported the need for reform) and the Commons refused to grant money for the war unless most of the great officers of state were dismissed and the king's mistress Alice Perrers, another focus of popular resentment, was barred from any further association with him. But even after the government acceded to virtually all their demands, the Commons then refused to authorise any funds for the war, losing the sympathy of the Lords as a result.

The death of the Black Prince on 8 June 1376 and the onset of Edward III's last illness at the closing of Parliament on 10 July left John with all the reins of power. He immediately had the ailing king grant pardons to all the officials impeached by the Parliament; Alice Perrers too was reinstated at the heart of the king's household. John impeached William of Wykeham and other leaders of the reform movement, and secured their conviction on old or trumped-up charges. The parliament of 1377 was John's counter-coup: crucially, the Lords no longer supported the Commons and John was able to have most of the acts of 1376 annulled. He also succeeded in forcing the Commons to agree to the imposition of the first poll tax in English history—a viciously regressive measure that bore hardest on the poorest members of society. There was organised opposition to his measures and rioting in London; John of Gaunt's arms were reversed or defaced wherever they were displayed, and protestors pasted up lampoons on his supposedly dubious birth. At one point he was forced to take refuge across the Thames, while his Savoy Palace only just escaped looting. It was rumoured (and believed by many people in England and France) that he intended to seize the throne for himself and supplant the rightful heir, his nephew Richard, the son of the Black Prince, but there seems to have been no truth in this and on the death of Edward III and the accession of the child Richard II, John sought no position of regency for himself and withdrew to his estates.

John's personal unpopularity persisted, however, and the failure of his expedition to Saint-Malo in 1378 did nothing for his reputation. By this time, too, some of his possessions were taken from him by the Crown. For example, his ship, the Dieulagarde, was seized and bundled with other royal ships to be sold to pay off the debts of Sir Robert de Crull, who during the latter part of King Edward III's reign had been the Clerk of the King's Ships, and had advanced monies to pay for the king's ships. During the Peasants' Revolt of 1381, John of Gaunt was far from the centre of events, on the March of Scotland, but he was among those named by the rebels as a traitor to be beheaded as soon as he could be found. The Savoy Palace was systematically destroyed by the mob and burned to the ground. Nominally friendly lords and even his own fortresses closed their gates to him, and John was forced to flee into Scotland with a handful of retainers and throw himself on the charity of King Robert II of Scotland until the crisis was over.

King of Castile

Upon his marriage to Constance of Castile in 1371, John assumed (officially from 29 January 1372) the title of King of Castile and León in right of his wife, and insisted his fellow English nobles henceforth address him as "my lord of Spain". He impaled his arms with those of the Spanish kingdom. From 1372, John gathered around himself a small court of refugee Castilian knights and ladies and set up a Castilian chancery that prepared documents in his name according to the style of Peter of Castile, dated by the Castilian era and signed by himself with the Spanish formula "Yo El Rey" ("I, the King"). He hatched several schemes to make good his claim with an army, but for many years these were still-born due to lack of finance or the conflicting claims of war in France or with Scotland. 

It was only in 1386, after Portugal under its new King John I had entered into a full alliance with England, that he was actually able to land with an army in Spain and mount a campaign for the throne of Castile (that ultimately failed). John sailed from England on 9 July 1386 with a huge Anglo-Portuguese fleet carrying an army of about 5,000 men plus an extensive "royal" household and his wife and daughters. Pausing on the journey to use his army to drive off the French forces who were then besieging Brest, he landed at Corunna in northern Spain on 29 July.

The Castilian king, John of Trastámara, had expected John would land in Portugal and had concentrated his forces on the Portuguese border. He was wrong-footed by John's decision to invade Galicia, the most distant and disaffected of Castile's kingdoms. From August to October, John of Gaunt set up a rudimentary court and chancery at Ourense and received the submission of the Galician nobility and most of the towns of Galicia, though they made their homage to him conditional on his being recognised as king by the rest of Castile. While John of Gaunt had gambled on an early decisive battle, the Castilians were in no hurry to join battle, and he began to experience difficulties keeping his army together and paying it. In November, he met King John I of Portugal at Ponte do Mouro on the south side of the Minho river and concluded an agreement with him to make a joint Anglo-Portuguese invasion of central Castile early in 1387. The treaty was sealed by the marriage of John's eldest daughter Philippa to the Portuguese king. A large part of John's army had succumbed to sickness, however, and when the invasion was mounted, they were far outnumbered by their Portuguese allies. The campaign of April–June 1387 was an ignominious failure. The Castilians refused to offer battle and the Galician-Anglo-Portuguese troops, apart from time-wasting sieges of fortified towns, were reduced to foraging for food in the arid Spanish landscape. They were harried mainly by French mercenaries of the Castilian king. Many hundreds of English, including close friends and retainers of John of Gaunt, died of disease or exhaustion. Many deserted or abandoned the army to ride north under French safe conducts. Shortly after the army returned to Portugal, John of Gaunt concluded a secret treaty with John of Trastámara under which he and his wife renounced all claim to the Castilian throne in return for a large annual payment and the marriage of their daughter Catherine to John of Trastámara's son, Henry.

Duke of Aquitaine
John left Portugal for Aquitaine, and he remained in that province until he returned to England in November 1389. This effectively kept him off the scene while England endured the major political crisis of the conflict between Richard II and the Lords Appellant, who were led by John of Gaunt's younger brother Thomas of Woodstock, Duke of Gloucester. Only four months after his return to England, in March 1390, Richard II formally invested Gaunt with the Duchy of Aquitaine, thus providing him with the overseas territory he had long desired. However, he did not immediately return to the province, but remained in England and mainly ruled through seneschals as an absentee duke. His administration of the province was a disappointment, and his appointment as duke was much resented by the Gascons, since Aquitaine had previously always been held directly by the king of England or his heir; it was not felt to be a fief that a king could bestow on a subordinate. 

From 1394 through 1395, he was forced to spend nearly a year in Gascony to shore up his position in the face of threats of secession by the Gascon nobles. He was one of England's principal negotiators in the diplomatic exchanges with France that led to the Truce of Leulinghem in 1396, and he initially agreed to join the French-led Crusade that ended in the disastrous Battle of Nicopolis, but withdrew due to ill-health and the political problems in Gascony and England. 

For the remainder of his life, John of Gaunt occupied the role of valued counsellor of the king and loyal supporter of the Crown. He did not even protest, it seems, when his younger brother Thomas was murdered at Richard's behest. It may be that he felt he had to maintain this posture of loyalty to protect his son Henry Bolingbroke (the future Henry IV), who had also been one of the Lords Appellant, from Richard's wrath; but, in 1398, Richard had Bolingbroke exiled, and on John of Gaunt's death the next year he disinherited Bolingbroke completely, seizing John's vast estates for the Crown.

Relationship with Geoffrey Chaucer
John of Gaunt was a patron and close friend of the poet Geoffrey Chaucer, best known for his work The Canterbury Tales. Near the end of their lives, Lancaster and Chaucer became brothers-in-law. Chaucer married Philippa (Pan) de Roet in 1366, and Lancaster took his mistress of nearly 30 years, Katherine Swynford (de Roet), who was Philippa Chaucer's sister, as his third wife in 1396. Although Philippa died c. 1387, the men were bound as brothers and Lancaster's children by Katherine—John, Henry, Thomas and Joan Beaufort—were Chaucer's nephews and niece.

Chaucer's The Book of the Duchess, also known as the Deeth of Blaunche the Duchesse, was written in commemoration of Blanche of Lancaster, John of Gaunt's first wife. The poem refers to John and Blanche in allegory as the narrator relates the tale of "A long castel with walles white/Be Seynt Johan, on a ryche hil" (1318–1319) who is mourning grievously after the death of his love, "And goode faire White she het/That was my lady name ryght" (948–949). The phrase "long castel" is a reference to Lancaster (also called "Loncastel" and "Longcastell"), "walles white" is thought to likely be an oblique reference to Blanche, "Seynt Johan" was John of Gaunt's name-saint, and "ryche hil" is a reference to Richmond; these thinly veiled references reveal the identity of the grieving black knight of the poem as John of Gaunt, Duke of Lancaster and Earl of Richmond. "White" is the English translation of the French word "blanche", implying that the white lady was Blanche of Lancaster.

Believed to have been written in the 1390s, Chaucer's short poem Fortune, is also inferred to directly reference Lancaster. "Chaucer as narrator" openly defies Fortune, proclaiming he has learned who his enemies are through her tyranny and deceit, and declares "my suffisaunce" (15) and that "over himself hath the maystrye" (14). Fortune, in turn, does not understand Chaucer's harsh words to her for she believes she has been kind to him, claims that he does not know what she has in store for him in the future, but most importantly, "And eek thou hast thy beste frend alyve" (32, 40, 48). Chaucer retorts that "My frend maystow nat reven, blind goddesse" (50) and orders her to take away those who merely pretend to be his friends. Fortune turns her attention to three princes whom she implores to relieve Chaucer of his pain and "Preyeth his beste frend of his noblesse/That to som beter estat he may atteyne" (78–79). The three princes are believed to represent the dukes of Lancaster, York, and Gloucester, and a portion of line 76, "as three of you or tweyne," to refer to the ordinance of 1390 which specified that no royal gift could be authorised without the consent of at least two of the three dukes. Most conspicuous in this short poem is the number of references to Chaucer's "beste frend". Fortune states three times in her response to the plaintiff, "And also, you still have your best friend alive" (32, 40, 48); she also references his "beste frend" in the envoy when appealing to his "noblesse" to help Chaucer to a higher estate. A fifth reference is made by "Chaucer as narrator" who rails at Fortune that she shall not take his friend from him. While the envoy playfully hints to Lancaster that Chaucer would certainly appreciate a boost to his status or income, the poem Fortune distinctively shows his deep appreciation and affection for John of Gaunt.

Death 

John of Gaunt died of natural causes on 3 February 1399 at Leicester Castle, with his third wife Katherine by his side.

He was buried beside his first wife, Blanche of Lancaster, in the choir of St Paul's Cathedral, adjacent to the high altar. Their magnificent tomb had been designed and executed between 1374 and 1380 by Henry Yevele with the assistance of Thomas Wrek, at a total cost of £592. The two alabaster effigies were notable for having their right hands joined. An adjacent chantry chapel was added between 1399 and 1403. The monument was severely damaged, and perhaps destroyed, during the period of the Interregnum (1649–1660); and anything that survived was lost (with the rest of the cathedral) in the Great Fire of London of 1666. A wall memorial in the crypt of the present cathedral lists Gaunt's as among the important lost monuments.

Family

Marriages 

 On 19 May 1359 at Reading Abbey, John married his third cousin, Blanche of Lancaster, younger of the two daughters of Henry of Grosmont, Duke of Lancaster. Both shared a common descent from King Henry III. The wealth she brought to the marriage was the foundation of John's fortune. Blanche died on 12 September 1368 at Tutbury Castle, while her husband was overseas. Their son Henry Bolingbroke became Henry IV of England, having deposed King Richard II, who had seized the duchy of Lancaster upon John's death while Henry was in exile. Their daughter Philippa of Lancaster became Queen of Portugal by marrying King John I of Portugal in 1387. All subsequent kings of Portugal were thus descended from John of Gaunt.
 In 1371, John married Infanta Constance of Castile, daughter of King Peter of Castile, thus giving him a claim to the Crown of Castile, which he would pursue. Though John was never able to make good his claim, his daughter by Constance, Catherine of Lancaster, became Queen of Castile by marrying Henry III of Castile. Catherine of Aragon is descended from this line. Constance died in 1394.
 During his marriage to Constance, John of Gaunt fathered four children by a mistress, the widow Katherine Swynford (whose sister Philippa Roet was married to Geoffrey Chaucer). Prior to her widowhood, Katherine had had at least two children with her husband, Sir Hugh Swynford from Kettlethorpe in Lincolnshire. These were Blanche, for whom John of Gaunt stood as godfather, and Thomas, later Sir Thomas.
 John married Katherine in 1396, and their four children, the Beauforts, were legitimised by King Richard II and the Church, but barred from inheriting the throne. From the eldest son, John, descended a granddaughter, Lady Margaret Beaufort, whose son, later King Henry VII of England, would nevertheless claim the throne.

Children 

 By Blanche of Lancaster:
 Philippa (1360–1415) married King John I of Portugal (1357–1433).
 John (1362–1365) was the first-born son of John and Blanche of Lancaster and lived possibly at least until after the birth of his brother Edward of Lancaster in 1365 and died before his second brother another short-lived boy called John in 1366. He was buried in the Collegiate Church of the Annunciation of Our Lady of The Newarke, Leicester (the church founded by his grandfather Henry, Duke of Lancaster).
 Elizabeth (1364–1426), married (1) in 1380 John Hastings, 3rd Earl of Pembroke (1372–1389), annulled 1383; married (2) in 1386 John Holland, 1st Duke of Exeter (1350–1400); (3) Sir John Cornwall, 1st Baron Fanhope and Milbroke (died 1443)
 Edward (1365) died within a year of his birth and was buried in the Collegiate Church of the Annunciation of Our Lady of The Newarke, Leicester.
 John (1366–1367) most likely died after the birth of his younger brother Henry, the future Henry IV of England; he was buried in the Collegiate Church of the Annunciation of Our Lady of The Newarke, Leicester.
 Henry IV of England (1367–1413) married (1) Mary de Bohun (1369–1394); (2) Joanna of Navarre (1368–1437)
Isabel (1368–1368).
 By Constance of Castile:
 Catherine (1373–1418), married King Henry III of Castile (1379–1406)
 John (1374–1375)
 By Katherine Swynford (née de Roet/Roelt), mistress and later wife (children legitimised 1397):
John Beaufort, 1st Earl of Somerset (1373–1410), married Margaret Holland. His great-grandson was Henry VII of England.
 Cardinal Henry Beaufort, Bishop of Winchester (1375–1447)
 Thomas Beaufort, Duke of Exeter (1377–1427), married Margaret Neville, daughter of Sir Thomas de Neville of Hornby by an unknown wife
 Joan Beaufort (1379–1440); married first Robert Ferrers, 5th Baron Boteler of Wem, and second Ralph Neville, 1st Earl of Westmorland
 By mistress Marie de St. Hilaire of Hainaut, a lady-in-waiting to John's mother, Queen Philippa:
 Blanche (1359–1388/1389), who married Sir Thomas Morieux (1355–1387) in 1381 and had no children. Morieux held several important posts, including Constable of the Tower the year he was married, and Master of Horse to King Richard II two years later.

Titles and arms

Titles and styles
Earl of Richmond: granted as an infant in September 1342, surrendered to the crown in June 1372.
Earl of Leicester, Earl of Lancaster, Earl of Derby: inherited jure uxoris in November 1362 following the death of his wife's father Henry of Grosmont.
Duke of Lancaster: granted as a new creation on 13 November 1362 following the death of the prior Duke, Henry of Grosmont.
King of Galicia, King of Castile, King of León: claimed in January 1372 by his second marriage to the heiress to these thrones, unrecognised except for a brief period when he was able to capture Galicia from 1386 to 1387; claim surrendered 1388.
Duke of Aquitaine (2 March 1390 – 3 February 1399): granted for life in March 1390 by his nephew, King Richard II of England

Arms

As a son of the sovereign, John bore the royal arms of the kingdom (Quarterly, France Ancient and England), differenced by a label of three points ermine.

As claimant to the throne of Castile and León from 1372, he impaled the arms of that kingdom (Gules, a castle or, quartering Argent, a lion rampant purpure) with his own. The arms of Castile and León appeared on the dexter side of the shield (the left-hand side as viewed), and the differenced English royal arms on the sinister; but in 1388, when he surrendered his claim, he reversed this marshalling, placing his own arms on the dexter, and those of Castile and León on the sinister. He thus continued to signal his alliance with the Castilian royal house, while abandoning any claim to the throne. There is, however, evidence that he may occasionally have used this second marshalling at earlier dates.

In addition to his royal arms, Gaunt bore an alternative coat of Sable, three ostrich feathers ermine. This was the counterpart to his brother, the Black Prince's, "shield for peace" (on which the ostrich feathers were white), and may have been used in jousting. The ostrich feather arms appeared in stained glass above Gaunt's chantry chapel in St Paul's Cathedral.

Legacy 
John of Gaunt is a character in William Shakespeare's play Richard II. Shortly before he dies, he makes a speech that includes the lines "This royal throne of kings, this scepter'd isle, This earth of majesty, this seat of Mars ... This blessed plot, this earth, this realm, this England". He is also referred to by Falstaff in Henry IV Part I.

Hungerford in Berkshire has ancient links to the Duchy, the manor becoming part of John of Gaunt's estate in 1362 before James I passed ownership to two local men in 1612 (which subsequently became Town & Manor of Hungerford Charity). The links are visible today in the Town & Manor-owned John O'Gaunt Inn on Bridge Street, the John O'Gaunt School on Priory Road, as well as various street names. It is customary for the Loyal Toast to be given by residents as "The Queen, the Duke of Lancaster".

The John of Gaunt School on Wingfield Road in Trowbridge, Wiltshire, is built upon land that he once owned.

Family Ancestry

References

Further reading

External links

 
 
 
 Sir Jean Froissart: John of Gaunt in Portugal, 1385
 The Katherine Swynford Society website
 

1340 births
1399 deaths
14th-century English nobility
Burials at St Paul's Cathedral
Dukes of Lancaster
Earls of Derby
6th Earl of Leicester
Earls of Richmond
Children of Edward III of England
English people of French descent
English people of Scottish descent
English people of Spanish descent
High Sheriffs of Lancashire
John of Gaunt
House of Plantagenet
Garter Knights appointed by Edward III
Lord High Stewards
Male Shakespearean characters
Nobility from Ghent
Pretenders to the throne of the kingdom of Castile
Peers created by Edward III
Sons of kings
Barons of Halton
Non-inheriting heirs presumptive